Monday Night Live at the Village Vanguard is an album by the Vanguard Jazz Orchestra. It won the Grammy Award for Best Large Jazz Ensemble Album in 2009.

Most of the songs and arrangements are by Thad Jones, who founded the group as the Thad Jones/Mel Lewis Orchestra. "Willow Tree" and "St. Louis Blues" were arranged by Bob Brookmeyer, an original member of the group.

Track listing

Personnel

 Jim McNeely – conductor, piano
 Billy Drewes – alto saxophone, soprano saxophone, clarinet, flute
 Dick Oatts – flute, piccolo, alto saxophone, soprano saxophone
 Ralph Lalama – clarinet, flute, tenor saxophone
 Rich Perry – flute, tenor saxophone
 Gary Smulyan – baritone saxophone
 Douglas Purviance – trombone, producer
 John Mosca – trombone
 Luis Bonilla – trombone
 Jason Jackson – trombone
 Nick Marchione – trumpet
 Frank Greene – trumpet
 Scott Wendholt – trumpet
 Terell Stafford – trumpet, flugelhorn
 John Clark – French horn
 Michael Weiss – piano, arranger
 Phil Palombi – double bass
 John Riley – drums
 Thomas Bellino – producer
 Ed Reed – engineer
 Benjamin Krumholz – engineer
 Rick Rivera – engineer
 Travis Steff – mixing
 Gary Chester – mixing
 Alan Silverman – remastering

References

2008 albums
Big band albums
Grammy Award for Best Large Jazz Ensemble Album